The Rosine General Store and Barn, also known as Woosley's General Store, is in the small hamlet of Rosine, Kentucky located at 8205 Blue Moon of Kentucky Highway / U.S. Route 62.  It was built in 1933 and expanded in 1947.  It was listed on the National Register of Historic Places in 2003.

It was a  structure when bought in 1943 by Edith and Everett Woosley.  They added an extension to make it .  Also on the property is a  board-and-batten vertical plank barn.

References

National Register of Historic Places in Ohio County, Kentucky
Commercial buildings completed in 1933
1933 establishments in Kentucky
Commercial buildings on the National Register of Historic Places in Kentucky
General stores in the United States
Barns on the National Register of Historic Places in Kentucky